John James Kinley  (23 September 1925 – 1 May 2012) was a Canadian engineer, industrialist and the 29th Lieutenant Governor of Nova Scotia since confederation.

Early life
Kinley was born in Lunenburg, the son of politician John James Kinley and Lila Evelyn Kinley (Young).

Career
Kinley was an engineering graduate of Dalhousie University, Nova Scotia Technical College and Massachusetts Institute of Technology. He has practiced professional engineering in business and the community for more than 50 years in executive positions at Lunenburg Foundry & Engineering Co. Ltd. and Lunenburg Marine Railway. He was the Honorary Chair for Life of the Nova Scotia Branch of the Canadian Manufacturers and Exporters, a former chair the Offshore Trade Association of Nova Scotia and a former director of the Canadian Foundry Association.

Kinley served in a number of military offices. He served in the Canadian Merchant Marine and Royal Canadian Navy and in Canada's Naval Reserve and Retired as Lieutenant Commander in 1958. He was a president of Branch #23, Royal Canadian Legion in Lunenburg, former president of the Navy League of Canada, Honorary Colonel of the #14 Airfield Engineering Squadron, Canadian Air Force and the West Nova Scotia Regiment. He was appointed the first Grand President of The Nova Scotia Command, Royal Canadian Legion.

Lieutenant Governor of Nova Scotia
Kinley was appointed by the Governor General, on the advice of Prime Minister Jean Chrétien, in May 1994. He was installed at a public ceremony at the World Trade and Convention Center in Halifax, Nova Scotia on June 23, 1994. He was sworn into office by Premier John Savage, Chief Justice Lorne Clarke and federal representatives for Governor General Ramon Hnatyshyn.

Death
Kinley died at the age of 86 in Lunenburg.

Personal life
Kinley was a longtime resident of Lunenburg with his wife Grace Elizabeth (MacPherson) Kinley and have raised four children; Paula, Peter, Edward, Shona and are grandparents of eleven grandchildren.

Honours

 

 Sir John Kennedy Medal; Engineering Institute of Canada
 Centennial Gold Medal, 100 years of Tech, TUNS and Dalhousie University, 2007
 Member of the Duke of Edinburgh's first Study Conference "Human Problems of Industrial Communities within the Commonwealth and Empire" Oxford in 1956, attended the 50th Anniversary Reunion at Buckingham Palace, London, May 2006.
 Fellow Engineering Institute of Canada
 Fellow of the Canadian Academy of Engineers
 Fellow of Canadian Society of Engineers
 Honorary Doctor of Engineering, Dalhousie University 1995
 Grand Commander of the Royal Norwegian Medal of Honour
 Knight of Grace, Knight of Justice and Vice Prior Order of Saint John of Jerusalem

Arms

References

External links
 John James Kinley at The Canadian Encyclopedia

1925 births
2012 deaths
Lieutenant Governors of Nova Scotia
Members of the Order of Nova Scotia